Mandler is a surname. Notable people with the surname include:

Albert Mandler (1929–1973), Israeli general
Anthony Mandler (born 1973), American music video director
George Mandler (1924–2016), American psychologist
James Mandler (1922–2007), American basketball player
Jean Matter Mandler (born 1929), American psychologist
Peter Mandler (born 1958), British historian and academic
Walter Mandler (1922–2005), lens designer